Paul Dickson may refer to:

Paul Dickson (writer) (born 1939), American writer
Paul Dickson (American football) (1937–2011), American football player

See also
Paul Dixon (disambiguation)